Jason Rogel is an American actor.  He recently played Sebastian on Season 2 of Raven's Home.  Rogel also starred as Ricky, the office gossip, on Freeform's Kevin from Work, and as Larry in ABC Family's Christmas musical, The Mistle-Tones. Also guest starring on Henry danger as Morgan Maykew.

Life and career
Rogel was born and raised in Long Beach, California.  He is of Filipino descent.

Rogel graduated with a bachelor's degree in Theatre Arts from California State University, Long Beach, and also studied acting at Australia's National Institute of Dramatic Art.

In 2009, Rogel appeared opposite Thomas Middleditch, Rachael Taylor, Lea Thompson, and Christopher McDonald in the indie romantic-comedy Splinterheads. Since then, he has appeared in various commercials, webseries, and television shows, including The Office, Community, Dexter, Bones, Monk, and How I Met Your Mother. He played Martin, the tech-savvy busboy in the 2011 SyFy original movie, Swamp Shark, also starring Kristy Swanson, D.B. Sweeney, Robert Davi and baseball legend Wade Boggs .  He also recurred as Physics grad student Leo on ABC Family's, State of Georgia, starring Raven-Symoné, Majandra Delfino and Loretta Devine.

In 2012, he starred alongside Tia Mowry and Tori Spelling in ABC Family's first original holiday musical, The Mistle-Tones, which premiered as part of their 25 Days of Christmas event.  Rogel also played cameraman Marcus on the MTV series, Zach Stone Is Gonna Be Famous starring comedian, Bo Burnham.

In addition to film and TV, Rogel has appeared in numerous theatre productions, working with such companies as East West Players, LoudRMouth, and The Garage Theatre Company. He has also toured his mini-musical, M.Saigon, a parody of the Broadway hit Miss Saigon, with the hereandnow Theatre Company.

In 2014, Rogel appeared in the Old Navy ads with Debra Wilson, Amy Poehler and Dascha Polanco.  He was a cast member of the Fil-Am sketch comedy show PUN PLIP PRIDAYS, which aired on LA18's Kababayan Today with G. Tongi. In 2015, he appeared opposite Regina Hall, Eve & Jill Scott in the Lifetime (TV network) Original, With This Ring (2015 film), written and directed by Nzingha Stewart.

Filmography and TV roles

References

External links
 

1976 births
Living people
American male film actors
American male television actors
American male actors of Filipino descent
21st-century American male actors
Male actors from Long Beach, California
California State University, Long Beach alumni